Donald T. Hawgood (March 20, 1917 – July 8, 2010) was a Canadian sprint canoer who competed in the early 1950s. He won a silver medal in the C-2 10000 m event at the 1952 Summer Olympics in Helsinki.

References
Donald Hawgood's profile at Sports Reference.com
Donald Hawgood's obituary

1917 births
2010 deaths
Canadian male canoeists
Canoeists at the 1952 Summer Olympics
Olympic canoeists of Canada
Olympic silver medalists for Canada
Olympic medalists in canoeing
Medalists at the 1952 Summer Olympics